Eonyang Market is a traditional street market about 2 km from Ulsan Station in Eonyang, Ulju County, Ulsan, South Korea. The market is spread out over 3386 m2 with more than 419 stores including many shops that sell fruit, vegetables, meat, fish, breads, clothing, and Korean traditional medicinal items. The market also has many small restaurants and street-food stalls.

Renovations
Due to the emergence of large discount stores in Ulsan, the city government began a market-revival initiative in the mid-2000s to improve the infrastructure around Ulsan's traditional markets, while attempting to maintain their traditional atmosphere. The renovations for Eonyang Market finished in 2009 and included the installation of a 177-meter long arcade to keep shoppers dry in rainy weather.

See also
 List of markets in South Korea
 List of South Korean tourist attractions

References

Ulju County
Retail markets in Ulsan
Food markets in South Korea